Antonio Veneziano may refer to:

Antonio Veneziano (poet) (1543–1593), Sicilian poet
Antonio Veneziano (painter), Italian painter active late 14th century